Melomania was an Australian music radio show. First broadcast in 2008, it was based at 5TCB FM in Bordertown, South Australia, and syndicated to radio stations in Australia, New Zealand, Canada, Sweden and United Kingdom. It was hosted by Scad, Hollie and Troy, and features a variety of music genres, with a skew towards country music.

The show retired in 2020 as per an announcement on their Facebook page

"It has been mixed emotions at Melomania HQ as we have decided to retire the show. Melomania has always been a passion project that has aired weekly on radio stations around the world to promote new music, especially up and coming talent that you wouldn't necessarily hear anywhere else and ask questions that are of no benefit to anybody but nice to know all the same.
It was not an easy decision to make as there have been so many wonderful friendships and opportunities made over the years with radio stations, distributors, musicians, male strippers, coaches, writers, producers, actors, record companies, promoters, managers, listeners, and the best co-host Mandy and Hollie could have ever asked for.
Last not least thank you for listening over the years maybe sometimes confused and hopefully at times entertained.  We will be airing our final program within the next few weeks with Scad, Hollie and Mandy as normal as possible...well  for Melomania anyway.
Until next time scadio/cya/wokka wokka, maybe not forever but for the time being.
Final episode delivery on 23rd July."

The Facebook page has subsequently been deleted.

Syndicates

New South Wales
 2GCR FM103.3 Goulburn
 2MIA Griffith
 2GHR Greater Hume Radio Holbrook
 91.1 Spirit FM Narrandera
 2GRR Sydney
 TEM-FM Temora
 Sounds of the Mountains Tumut
 94.5 Gold West Wyalong
 Ten FM Tenterfield

Victoria
 Voice FM 99.9 Ballarat
 Fresh FM Bendigo
 Radio EMFM Echuca/Moama
 OKR FM Kilmore
 Highlands FM Kyneton
 Hit Radio 87.6 Seymour
 OAK FM 101.3 Wangaratta
 Yarra Valley FM Woori Yallock

Queensland
 Switch 1197 Brisbane
 Wild Horse FM 99.7 Yarraman

South Australia
 5YYY Whyalla
 5TCB FM Bordertown, South Australia

Western Australia
 Bunbury Community Radio Bunbury
 Radio MAMA Carnavon, Geraldton
 Collie Community Radio 1089am Collie

References

Air News
Southern Community Media Assosication

External links
 Melomania

Australian radio programs
2000s Australian radio programs
2010s Australian radio programs